Robert Pearse Gillies (9 November 1789 – 28 November 1858) was a Scottish poet and writer.

References 

19th-century Scottish writers
Scottish translators
19th-century Scottish poets
1789 births
1858 deaths